The Watershed Alliance of Marin is a 501(c)(3) non-profit network of organizations with a shared purpose of preserving the watersheds of Marin County, California.

History
It has made efforts to maintain coho salmon populations in the Lagunitas and Redwood creeks. In 2014, it reported that coho salmon had not returned to spawn at Redwood Creek.

References

External links
Watershed Alliance of Marin website

Watersheds of California
Organizations based in Marin County, California
Environment of the San Francisco Bay Area